Potato waffles are a potato-based savoury dish in a waffle shape. They are common in the United Kingdom and Ireland and are also available in some other countries, including Australia, Canada and United States.

They are made of potato, oil, and seasonings. They are sold frozen, and may be baked, grilled, or fried, and are used as a side dish, often together with sausages or bacon, or as a snack food. One of the leading brands is Birds Eye, who introduced the item in 1981.

See also

 List of potato dishes

References

Fast food
Potato dishes
Food and drink introduced in 1981
Waffles